Platybunus is a genus of harvestmen in the family Phalangiidae.

Species
 Platybunus arbuteus Simon, 1879
 Platybunus alpinorelictus J. Martens, 1978
 Platybunus anatolicus Roewer, 1956
 Platybunus bucephalus (C.L.Koch, 1835)
 Platybunus buresi Silhavý, 1965
 Platybunus decui Avram, 1968
 Platybunus femoralis Roewer, 1956
 Platybunus hadzii Kratchvil, 1935
 Platybunus hypanicus (Silhavý, 1966)
 Platybunus jeporum Avram, 1968
 Platybunus juvarae Avram, 1968
 Platybunus kratochvili Hadzi, 1973
 Platybunus mirus Loman, in Weber 1892
 Platybunus nigrovittatus Simon, 1879
 Platybunus hungaricus Szalay, 1949
 Platybunus pallidus Silhavý, 1938
 Platybunus pinetorum (C.L.Koch, 1839)
 Platybunus placidus Simon, 1879
 Platybunus pucillus Roewer, 1952
 Platybunus strigosus (L.Koch, 1867)
 Platybunus triangularis (Herbst, 1799)

References

Harvestmen